The OSS Fighters is a Romanian kickboxing gym and promotion. The company was founded in 2018, being one of the largest kickboxing promotions in Romania, alongside the Dynamite Fighting Show and the Colosseum Tournament. It also promotes mixed martial arts.

It has featured fighters such as Bogdan Stoica, Andrei Stoica, Fabio Kwasi, Amansio Paraschiv, Cristian Spetcu, Ștefan Orza, Cristian Ristea, Cristian Milea, and Daniel Pattvean, among others.

The OSS Fighters are in partnerships with the Superkombat Fighting Championship (SUPERKOMBAT), the World Kickboxing Federation (WKF) and the World Kickboxing and Karate Union (WKU).

In 2020, OSS Fighters started airing live events on Sport Extra with the debut event on Sport Extra being OSS Fighters 05, ending the partnership with FightBox. In Romania, it can be seen on Digi Sport.

One Star Security has been a major sponsor of OSS Fighters since its inception.

Events
Each OSS Fighters event contains several fights. Traditionally, every event starts off with an opening fight followed by other fights, with the last fight being known as the main event.

See also
 OSS Fighters in 2021
 Dynamite Fighting Show
 Colosseum Tournament
 Golden Fighter Championship
 KO Masters

References

External links
 OSS Fighters on Facebook 
 Clubul Sportiv OSS Fighters

2018 establishments in Romania
Kickboxing organizations
Mixed martial arts organizations
Sports organizations established in 2018
Companies based in Constanța